The 1964 Tripoli Fair Tournament was the 3rd edition of football at the Tripoli International Fair, and was held from 8 to 17 March 1964 in Tripoli, Libya. Five teams participated: Lebanon, Libya, Morocco B, Sudan B, and Malta B. Lebanon won the tournament.

Matches

References

Tripoli International Fair
1964
1964 Tripoli International Fair